Richard Clitheroe (died 1420), of Clitheroe, Lancashire and London and Goldstone in Ash-next-Sandwich, Kent, was an English politician.

Clitheroe married a woman named Alice and they had one son and probably one daughter.

He was a Member (MP) of the Parliament of England for Kent in 1406 and 1407.

References

Year of birth missing
1420 deaths
English MPs 1406
People from Clitheroe
People from Ash, Dover District
English MPs 1407